Love Me Again (Land Down Under) is a 2008 Philippine romantic-drama film starring Angel Locsin with Piolo Pascual released under Star Cinema. The film was directed by award-winning film director Rory Quintos.

Love Me Again had its world premiere in Los Angeles on December 6, 2008 and in San Francisco, California on December 7, 2008. It opened in Philippine theaters last January 15, 2009. This film is the first ever Philippine film with an all cast of Filipinos to be shown in a premiere in the United States and this is also the first big-screen team-up of Piolo Pascual and Angel Locsin after the success of Lobo.

Plot

Arah (Angel Locsin) dreams of a better life—different from the life she knows in Bukidnon. Ranches everywhere are closing one by one. The glory her hometown once knew was slowly disappearing in favour of life abroad, particularly in Australia. Arah believes this too. Australia will save them from poverty. But Migo (Piolo Pascual) does not share this belief. He believes that Bukidnon’s glory will return if only people didn’t leave.

When Arah’s father suddenly encounters an accident, Arah is left with no choice but to seek better opportunities to earn money. Arah, in desperation accepts money from the Australian rancher Brian in exchange for a contract. Her decision breaks Migo’s heart. The two part ways, their problems unresolved.

With the help of her co-workers, especially her newfound friend, Ina (a Filipina working there as a cook), Arah slowly adjusted to the life in Australia. She is willing to hold her ground and tough it up along with the boys just to fulfill her dreams for herself and her family. It was this determination that caught the attention of the cold and mysterious Brian.

Meanwhile, Migo was experiencing his own wave of reality. Bukidnon is not what it used to be. And fighting to keep a ranch alive and working is something he cannot do without enough
experience. Despite his enthusiasm and hard work, his investments crumble slowly until he is left with nothing but a humbling realization—there is money in Australia, but his dreams shouldn’t really end there. Migo decides to give the land down under a try. With fierce hopes of earning back what he lost, he flies to Australia, to the land where his beloved Arah went when she left him for her dreams.

Suddenly, Migo’s presence at the ranch is making Arah suspicious. It’s been years—why is he suddenly there? But destiny has other plans for the two. By a simple twist of fate, the two are thrown together on an errand. The close proximity forces the two to confront their past. And undeniably, their feelings for each other resurface.

Will Migo let Arah in her heart again or will she let him go completely for the sake of Brian and her family? And will Migo find the courage to fight for her or learn to accept that he has lost her forever?

Cast

Piolo Pascual as Migo
Angel Locsin as Arah
Ricky Davao as Wayne
Ronnie Lazaro as Dodong
Dimples Romana as Yna
Erich Gonzales as Lovely
Nash Aguas as Ariel
John Manalo as Anthony
Brent Metken as Brian
AJ Dee as Koboy
Chanda Romero as Migo's Mom
Dominic Ochoa as Migo's Brother

Production
The cast, including Angel Locsin and Piolo Pascual, trained for weeks in horseback riding at the Manila Polo Club under the guidance of couturiers Vic Barba and Mikee Cojuangco. The film was shot in Impasug-ong and Malaybalay, Bukidnon. It was also shot in Darwin, Northern Territory, Australia.

The film was retitled from Land Down Under to Love Me Again.

Reception
Land Down Under has a total gross of ₱ 65.1 million, according to Box Office Mojo.

References

External links

Angel Locsin Website
Love Me Again shooting at Bukidnon

2008 films
2008 romantic comedy films
Films directed by Rory Quintos
Films set in Australia
Philippine romantic comedy films
Star Cinema films
Filipino-language films